Petter Oskar Lennartsson (born 13 March 1988) is a Swedish footballer, currently playing for Elverum. He has made two appearances as a sub in Allsvenskan.

Career statistics

External links

Living people
1988 births
Swedish footballers
Kalmar FF players
Nybergsund IL players
Allsvenskan players
Norwegian First Division players
Swedish expatriate footballers
Expatriate footballers in Norway
Swedish expatriate sportspeople in Norway
Association football defenders